Metarhinus is a genus of brontothere endemic to North America.

References

Brontotheres
Eocene odd-toed ungulates
Eocene genus extinctions
Eocene mammals of Asia
Fossil taxa described in 1908